State Street Sadie is a 1928 American crime drama film directed by Archie Mayo, and released as a silent film with talking sequences using Warner Bros.' Vitaphone sound-on-disc process. This is regarded as a lost film.

Cast
 Conrad Nagel as Ralph Blake
 Myrna Loy as Isobel
 William Russell as The Bat
 George E. Stone as Slinky
 Pat Hartigan as The Bull Hawkins
 Charles K. French

References

External links

Lobby card from State Street Sadie

1928 films
American black-and-white films
Films directed by Archie Mayo
Lost American films
Transitional sound films
American crime drama films
1928 crime drama films
Films scored by Louis Silvers
American silent feature films
Lost drama films
1928 lost films
1920s American films
Silent American drama films